Alsószentmárton is a village in Baranya county, Hungary. It is located near the border with Croatia.

The population is composed of the Romani people.

External links 
 Local statistics 

Populated places in Baranya County